Andreas Veerpalu  (born 24 May 1994) is an Estonian cross-country skier who competes internationally.
 
He represented Estonia at the 2018 Winter Olympics.

On 27 February 2019, during the FIS Nordic World Ski Championships 2019, Veerpalu was arrested along with four other skiers, Estonia's Karel Tammjärv, Kazakhstan's Alexey Poltoranin and Austrians Max Hauke and Dominik Baldauf, on suspicion of using blood doping assisted by German sports doctor Mark Schmidt. On release from police custody both Estonians admitted using blood doping.

Personal
Andreas is the son of former Estonian cross-country skier, Andrus Veerpalu. His sister Anette is also a cross-country skier for Estonia.

References

External links
 
 
 

1994 births
Living people
People from Otepää
Estonian male cross-country skiers
Estonian sportspeople in doping cases
Olympic cross-country skiers of Estonia
Cross-country skiers at the 2018 Winter Olympics
Cross-country skiers at the 2012 Winter Youth Olympics
Doping cases in cross-country skiing
21st-century Estonian people